Agincourt was launched in 1841. She spent most of her career sailing between Britain and the Far East. She foundered in 1866 on a voyage from Southampton to Hong Kong.

Career
Agincourt first appeared in Lloyd's Register in 1841 with Walker, master, and Green, owner. The 1842 volume gave her trade as London–Calcutta.

She sank the next day. Agincourt, Nesbitt, master, rescued her crew.

Loss
Agincourt foundered on 24 June 1866 at  while sailing from Southampton to Hong Kong with coal and boilers. The crew was saved but the captain died of exhaustion. 

Lloyd's Register for 1866 had the notation "LOST" by her name.

Citations and references
Citations

References

1841 ships
Age of Sail merchant ships of England
Maritime incidents in June 1866